Harry Wood (born 2 August 2002) is an English professional footballer who plays for Hull City.

Career
Harry Wood is a youth product of Hull City's Academy, though he previously played junior football for Manchester United.

Wood made his professional debut for Hull when he came on as an 81st-minute substitute for Regan Slater in the final match of the 2020–21 season away to Charlton Athletic.

On 10 May 2021, Wood signed a new two-year contract with Hull City.

On 31 August 2021, Wood moved to Scunthorpe United, on a season-long loan. On 31 January 2022, Wood was recalled by Hull City.

Personal life
Wood was born in Leeds, England.

Career statistics

Club

Honours

Club
Hull City
EFL League One champions: 2020–21

References

External links
 
 Hull City Profile

2002 births
Footballers from Leeds
Living people
English footballers
Association football midfielders
Hull City A.F.C. players
Scunthorpe United F.C. players